Obrestad is a very small farming village in Hå municipality in Rogaland county, Norway.

A harbour was constructed in Obrestad in 1874 and it is still in use. A sea rescue station for seafarers was established at Obrestad in 1854. It was in use until 1977.

History 
Local landowner Eirik Bjodaskalle, who lived around 950 AD, is said to have had his large farm at Obrestad. Eirik Bjodaskalle was the father of Queen Astrid, the mother of the famous Viking King Olaf Tryggvason. Snorri Sturluson chronicles this in the Saga of King Olaf Tryggvason which is part of Heimskringla. Obrestad was the place where Astrid and Olaf had to seek refuge before heading east.

Obrestad surname
Many families that lived in Obrestad over the centuries took Obrestad as their surname such as:
 Tor Obrestad (1938–2020), a Norwegian contemporary writer
 Annette Obrestad (born 1988), a Norwegian poker player

References

Villages in Rogaland
Hå
Jæren
Farms in Rogaland